Procalpurnus is a genus of sea snails, marine gastropod mollusks in the family Ovulidae.

Species
Species within the genus Procalpurnus include:

 Procalpurnus lacteus (Lamarck, 1810)
 Procalpurnus semistriatus (Pease, 1862)
Species brought into synonymy
 Procalpurnus adamsii (Reeve, 1865): synonym of Procalpurnus semistriatus (Pease, 1863)

References

Ovulidae